Syud Hossain (23  June 1888 – 26 February 1949) was an Indian journalist, an Indian independence activist, and the first Indian ambassador to Egypt in the Jawaharlal Nehru administration.

Early life
Syud Hossain was born in Calcutta in the then Bengal Presidency, British India in 1888. His father, Nawab Syud Mahomed Khan Bahadur (1850–1915), was the Inspector-General of Registration, Bengal. His great-great-grandfather was Mir Ashraf Ali Khan (d. 1829). Syud Hossain's mother was the daughter of Nawab Abdul Latif, a social reformer of Bengal. Sher-e-Bangla A. K. Fazlul Huq (1873–1962) and Sir Hassan Suhrawardy (1888–1946), were his brother-in-laws.

Hossain passed his Entrance Examination in 1904 and F.A. in 1906 from the Muhammadan Anglo-Oriental College of Aligarh. He then joined the Bengal Civil Service as a Sub-Deputy Collector in Calcutta but he soon went to England to pursue further education in 1909.

Career 
Hossain started his journalism career early in life and became the editor of Motilal Nehru's nationalist newspaper, The Independent.

Hossain wrote "Echoes from Old Dacca", published in May 1909 and "Gandhi: The Saint as Statesman" in 1937.

Hossain represented India at the Paris Peace Conference in 1920 for the Near Eastern Peace settlement.

In the 1930s, he moved to California. He served as a lecturer at the University of Southern California's Department of History as a visiting faculty lecturer. He taught two courses entitled "India's Civilization" and "Islamic Civilization" in the summer of 1934. The university later conferred on him an honorary doctorate degree.

When Hossain left the United States for India in 1946, a farewell dinner was organised for him at the Ceylon India Inn in New York City where the guests include Ragini Devi, Habib Rahman, and Indrani Rahman.

References

1888 births
1949 deaths
Bengali Muslims
Bengali writers
20th-century Bengalis
Bengali activists
Indian journalists
Ambassadors of India to Egypt
Indian male journalists
20th-century Indian journalists
Gandhians
Journalists from West Bengal
Indian editors
Indian newspaper journalists
Indian newspaper editors
Indian essayists
20th-century Indian essayists
Indian columnists
Indian political journalists
Indian activists